La Grange Nunataks is a scattered group of nunataks extending west for  from the mouth of Gordon Glacier, on the north side of the Shackleton Range, Antarctica. They were first mapped in 1957 by the Commonwealth Trans-Antarctic Expedition (CTAE), and were photographed in 1967 by U.S. Navy aircraft. They were named by the UK Antarctic Place-Names Committee for Johannes J. La Grange, a South African meteorologist with the CTAE.

Features
Geographical features include:

 Butterfly Knoll
 Mathys Bank
 Morris Hills
 Mount Beney
 Mount Etchells
 The Dragons Back
 True Hills
 Wiggans Hills

References

Nunataks of Coats Land